Banshay is a weapon-based martial art from Myanmar focusing primarily on the sword, staff and spear. Influenced by both Indian and Chinese sources, it is closely related to similar Southeast Asian systems such as Thai krabi krabong, Cambodian kbach kun boran and Malay silat.

Banshay makes extensive use of the dha (sword) in pairs. Sword-fencing demonstrations and performances often begin with a pre-fight war dance in which the swordsman spins one or two swords very close to the body without cutting themselves.

There are 37 sword forms. Sword training is conducted with the weapon still sheathed. Traditionally when a master first presents the student with a sword, the scabbard would be fixed on so that the trainee is discouraged from killing opponents. Under extreme conditions when the sword must be unsheathed, the scabbard may be broken with a rock or other object.

See also

Angampora
Bataireacht
Bōjutsu
Gatka
Jūkendō
Kalaripayattu
Kendo
Kenjutsu
Krabi–krabong
Kuttu Varisai
Mardani khel
Silambam
Silambam Asia
Tahtib
Thang-ta
Varma kalai
World Silambam Association
Bando
Lethwei
Naban
Kbachkun boraan

References

Burmese martial arts